Gareth Richard Milasinovich (born 15 December 1992) is a South African rugby union player, who plays for Ulster Rugby. He can play as a loosehead or tighthead prop.

Rugby career

Youth and Varsity Cup rugby

Milasinovich was born in Johannesburg, where he attended St John's College.

It wasn't until 2015 that he next featured in a nationwide competition, when he played for the University of Johannesburg in the Varsity Cup competition. He started all seven of their matches in the loosehead prop position, with UJ winning three of those matches, failing to qualify for the semi-finals.

Worcester Warriors

After the 2015 Varsity Cup, Milasinovich moved to England to join the academy of English Premiership side Worcester Warriors. He had a short spell at Championship side Yorkshire Carnegie, making two appearances for the Leeds-based side at the start of the 2015–16 season.

He made his debut for Worcester Warriors in their European Rugby Challenge Cup, coming on as a replacement in their opening match in Pool 4 of the competition against French side . He started their next match against Italian side Zebre, eventually playing in five of their six matches as Worcester Warriors finished bottom of the Pool 4 log to be eliminated from the competition. He made his Premiership debut on 5 December 2015, playing off the bench in a 20–29 defeat to Leicester Tigers. He made three further substitute appearances over the course of the season as the Worcester Warriors finished in tenth position. In his final match against Exeter Chiefs, Milasinovich suffered an achilles tendon rupture, ruling him out of injury for several months. Despite this injury, Milasinovich was promoted to the senior squad prior to the 2016–17 season.

Ulster

Milasinovich joined Irish Pro14 side Ulster ahead of the 2019–20 season. In July 2019 he sustained an injury to his ACL, ruling him out for several months. He has since fully recovered.

He is Irish-qualified through his grandfather, Norman McFarland, who was from Ulster and represented the province as a hooker.

He joined Saracens on a two-month loan at the end of 2021.

References

External links
Ulster Rugby profile
United Rugby Championship profile

ItsRugby profile

South African rugby union players
Living people
1992 births
Rugby union players from Johannesburg
Rugby union props
Worcester Warriors players
Leeds Tykes players
Ulster Rugby players
Saracens F.C. players
South African expatriate sportspeople in England
South African expatriate sportspeople in Northern Ireland
Expatriate rugby union players in England
Expatriate rugby union players in Northern Ireland
South African expatriate rugby union players
University of Johannesburg alumni